Larutia seribuatensis, also known as the two-lined two-toed skink or Seribuat larut skink, is a species of skink. It is endemic to the Seribuat Archipelago (Malaysia) and occurs on Tioman Island as well as its small neighbor, Tulai Island.

References

seribuatensis
Reptiles of Malaysia
Endemic fauna of Malaysia
Reptiles described in 2003
Taxa named by Jesse L. Grismer
Taxa named by Tzi Ming Leong
Taxa named by Norsham S. Yaakob